Rosa Anneli Meriläinen (born 31 December 1975) is Finnish former politician from Tampere.
Meriläinen has a master's degree in political science from the University of Tampere. She was elected to the parliament of Finland in 2003. She represents the Green League. Before that, she was the co-president of the green league and an assistant to Satu Hassi.

In an interview by the Image-magazine Meriläinen confessed to have used cannabis as a representative during her career, and she confirmed the matter to MTV3 news. She was prosecuted for a drug offense, but was relieved of charges.

She reports of the political work on her blog. She is engaged to comedian Simo Frangén, with whom she has a son, Frans, born 2006.

The Finnish version of the pornographic magazine Hustler once printed a comic strip featuring a parody character of Meriläinen. Meriläinen sued the magazine, and the character's name was changed to be less recognisable.

References 

  Personal homepages

1975 births
Living people
Politicians from Tampere
Green League politicians
Members of the Parliament of Finland (2003–07)
Women members of the Parliament of Finland
Finnish feminists
Finnish bloggers
Finnish women bloggers
21st-century Finnish women politicians